The China–Japan-South Korea Free Trade Agreement is a proposed free trade agreement between China, Japan and South Korea. The China-Japan-South Korea Free Trade Agreement was proposed in 2002. Negotiations on the agreement were set in motion in 2012. The three nations make up to 19.6%  of the world's economy. The first official talks on the matter were held in Seoul from 26–28 March 2013. Further talks were held in China and Japan throughout 2013, and more were scheduled for early 2014.  Two-way trade between South Korea and China was totaled at $230 billion in 2013.

A trilateral investment has been signed by all 3 nations. An agreement would push forward the integration of Asia's economies. The whole of Asia, along with the rest of the world economy, would benefit from their intimate and progressive trade relationship.

A fourth round of talks were held in Seoul, South Korea from 4–7 March 2014.

Intersessional Meeting of the Negotiations on Free Trade Agreement among Japan, China and the Republic of Korea was held in Tokyo, on June 17–18, 2014  before the fifth round of talks was scheduled for later that summer.

The eleventh round of talks were held from January 9–11, 2017 where trade in goods, trade in services, and investment were discussed.

The twelfth round of talks were held in Tokyo on April 10–13, 2017 

The thirteenth round of talks were held in Seoul on March 22–23, 2018.

The fourteenth round of talks were held in Beijing on December 6–7, 2018.

The fifteenth round of talks were held in Tokyo April 9–12, 2019. "This round of negotiations is the first one after the three parties reached a consensus on comprehensive speed-up negotiations. The three parties held a meeting of the chief negotiators, director generals’ consultation and 13 sub-conferences on specific topics, reached positive consensuses on the methods and paths for the negotiation of relevant issues, and clarified the work arrangements for the next step. The three parties unanimously agreed to further increase the level of trade and investment liberalization based on the consensus reached in the Regional Comprehensive Economic Partnership Agreement (RCEP) in which the three parties all participated, and to incorporate high-standard rules to create a RCEP Plus free trade agreement."- fta.mofcom.gov.cn It has been speculated that negotiations will be sped-up based on the current US government "Trade-War" with China.

The sixteenth round of talks were held in Seoul on November 27 to 29, 2019.

See also
Trilateral Cooperation Secretariat
China–Japan–South Korea trilateral summit

References

Proposed free trade agreements
Free trade agreements of South Korea
Free trade agreements of China
Free trade agreements of Japan
China–Japan–South Korea relations